The 2019 Wealden District Council election took place on 2 May 2019 to elect all members of Wealden District Council in England. Due to new ward boundaries, the number of total seats was reduced to 45 seats, elected from 41 wards.

Summary

Election result

|-

Ward Results

Arlington

Buxted

Chiddingly, East Hoathly & Waldron

Crowborough Central

Crowborough Jarvis Brook

Crowborough North

Crowborough South East

Crowborough South West

Crowborough St Johns

Danehill & Fletching

Forest Row

Framfield & Cross-in-Hand

Frant & Wadhurst

Hadlow Down & Rotherfield

Hailsham Central

Hailsham East

Hailsham North

Hailsham North West

Hailsham South

Hailsham West

Hartfield

Heathfield North

Heathfield South

Hellingly

Herstmonceux & Pevensey Levels

Horam & Punnetts Town

Lower Willingdon

Maresfield

Mayfield & Five Ashes

Pevensey Bay

Polegate Central

Polegate North

Polegate South & Willingdon Watermill

South Downs

Stone Cross

Uckfield East

Uckfield New Town

Uckfield North

Uckfield Ridgewood & Little Horsted

Upper Willingdon

Withyham

By-elections

Hailsham North by-election

Hailsham South by-election, May 2021

Heathfield North by-election

Heathfield South by-election

Hartfield by-election

Hailsham South by-election, February 2022

References 

2019 English local elections
May 2019 events in the United Kingdom
2019
2010s in East Sussex